White Sea Throat is a strait in northwestern Russia. It separates the Kola Peninsula from the Winter Coast, and connects the White Sea in the south-west with the Barents Sea in the north-east. It is 160 km long and 46–93 km wide.

References 

 Map 

Straits of Russia
Bodies of water of Murmansk Oblast
Straits of the Arctic Ocean